Arla Foods Ltd is a major dairy products company in the United Kingdom, based in Leeds, and a subsidiary of the  Arla Foods Group, which is owned by its farmer owners in seven countries including the UK.

Company profile
The company was created by the merger in 1980 of the British dairy group Express Dairies and the British subsidiary of Arla Foods, a Swedish Danish dairy production co operative, jointly owned by Swedish and Danish farmers. The parent company, Arla Foods Amba, initially held a 51% stake, but acquired the rest of the company's shares in April 2007.

In Britain, Arla supplies milk to retailers and produces many household brands, such as Lurpak, Anchor Butter, Cravendale, Lactofree and Castello.

Name 

The company name Arla is an archaic Swedish term for "early (in the morning)". Arla was originally chosen as the name of the Swedish company as Stora arla gård, "Great Arla Farm" in County Västmanland, Sweden, was one of the early founding members of today's cooperative.

History of parent 

Arla Foods was formed as the result of the merger in 2000 of Swedish dairy cooperative Arla, and the Danish dairy company MD Foods in April 2000. Swedish Arla derived from an early dairy producing cooperative, originally called Mjölkcentralen (MC) founded in 1926 in Stockholm. Danish MD Foods was the result of the merger in May 1999, of Kløver Mælk and MD Foods. MD originally stood for Mejeriselskabet Danmark. The merged company is headquartered in Aarhus, Denmark. It’s UK farmers were formally part of the co-operative MilkLink till members voted to join Arla in 2012.

Arla Foods is today owned by approximately 8,956 milk producers (2021) in Denmark, Sweden, Luxembourg, Germany, Belgium, Netherlands and the UK.

https://www.arlausa.com/company/unser-unternehmen/history/

Products

Arla is the largest supplier of fresh milk and cream in the United Kingdom, producing over 2.2 billion litres of milk per year. It produces two premium milk brands: Cravendale filtered milk, which undergoes a filtration process to remove bacteria before pasteurization; and Lactofree milk, from which lactose is removed, making it suitable for most lactose intolerant people. Following the success of Lactofree milk, Arla introduced a range of lactose-free products, including cheese and yoghurt.

As well as fresh milk, Arla produces the  Anchor butter brand in the United Kingdom and Lurpak is produced by its Danish farmers. This was not widely publicised by the company, even though the brands had been established over decades as brands for butter imported from Denmark and New Zealand respectively. Other products include fromage frais, yoghurts and the blue cheeses Rosenborg and Danish Blue. The firm also produces fruit juice.

Locations
The company has processing plants in England at Palmers Green (London), Stourton (Leeds), Settle (North Yorkshire) and Malpas (Cheshire), and in Scotland at Lockerbie. In January 2009, Arla ceased production at their dairy in Manchester. The company also operates the world's largest milk processing plant in Aylesbury, which was opened on 24 May 2014.

Arla Foods obtained the Westbury Dairies plant in January 2016, in Westbury, Wiltshire, which has become the primary site for the production of Anchor butter and Anchor Spreadable.

Arla Foods briefly operated the Milk Link dairy in Crediton, Devon following the merger with Milk Link in 2012.  However was sold in a management buyout in April 2013 with the Crediton operations being renamed as Crediton Dairy Limited.

Controversies
According to the BBC, in August 2015, farmers were paid less per pint of milk by Arla than by supermarkets that buy directly.

In August 2021, people acting on behalf of Animal Rebellion blockaded Arla's dairy facility in Aylesbury citing the large climate and ecological burden of dairy production when compared to plant based alternatives. The same site was again blockaded in September 2022.

References

External links

Arla Foods
British companies established in 2003
Companies formerly listed on the London Stock Exchange
Dairy products companies of the United Kingdom
Manufacturing companies based in Leeds
British subsidiaries of foreign companies